Saxelbye (or Saxelby) is a small village and former civil parish, now in the parish of Grimston, in the district of Melton in Leicestershire, England. The village lies about three miles to the north-west of Melton Mowbray and is situated on the southern slope of the ridge that makes up the southern boundary of the Vale of Belvoir. In 1931 the parish had a population of 75. On 1 April 1936 the parish of Saxelby was abolished and merged with Grimston.

The very fine Grade II* church with its crocketed spire is dedicated to St Peter.

Webster’s Dairy in Saxelbye, founded in 1883, is one of only six dairies where Stilton cheese is produced.

The Old Dalby Test Track passes close to the village.

References

External links

Parish council website
Saxelbye Conservation Area description

Villages in Leicestershire
Borough of Melton